Jaan Tõnisson's first cabinet was in office in Estonia from 18 November 1919 to 28 July 1920, when it was succeeded by Ado Birk's cabinet.

Members

This cabinet's members were the following:

References

Cabinets of Estonia